Clyde Hill is a city located in King County, Washington. It is part of the Eastside region, located to the east of Seattle, and is bordered by the cities and towns of Bellevue, Kirkland, Medina, Yarrow Point and Hunts Point. The population was 2,984 at the 2010 census.

Based on per capita income, Clyde Hill ranks 4th of 522 areas in the state of Washington to be ranked. In 2014, it was listed as the most affluent town in Washington State by Slate.

Clyde Hill is also ranked 10th in the United States for most landscapers hired per square mile, at about 1,000 households per mile.

The majority of Clyde Hill is zoned for single-family use with the exception of two commercially zoned areas: a gas station and a coffee shop.  In addition to a small government zone, the City is home to four schools:  two public schools - Clyde Hill Elementary and Chinook Middle School; and two private schools:  Bellevue Christian School and Sacred Heart School.  The City's minimum lot size is 20,000 square feet, although many smaller lots exist that pre-date the incorporation of the City.

Geography
Clyde Hill is located at  (47.630171, -122.216559).

The top elevation is close to 375 feet.  There are approximately 21 miles of public roadways in Clyde Hill.

History

Between 1946 and 1948, J. Gordon and Mary Schneidler subdivided and sold more than a dozen lots in a five-acre subdivision in Clyde Hill.

In response to the community's desire to control land use development such as lot size and commercial zoning, Clyde Hill was officially incorporated as a Town on March 31, 1953.  On November 10, 1998, the Council voted to organize Clyde Hill as a non-charter Code City.

In 1953 area residents voted to become an incorporated Town by a vote of 145 to 117.  Ken Day defeated Don Clark for the first Clyde Hill Mayors position, 91 to 58.  All initial Councilmembers were elected on write-in votes.

The first elected Councilmembers were:
F. Lee Campbell, - Robert W. Glueck, - P.A. Jacobsen,
Leslie M. Rudy and A.C. Thompson Sr.

John Woodin became the Town's first Treasurer.  Ken Day appointed Priscilla Alden Townsend as Police Judge and Roger Bryan as Marshall.

The 1975 Mayoral election in Clyde Hill brought with it suspense and the national media.  The two candidates, the incumbent Liberino "Lib" Tufarolo and Miles Nelson finished the election in an even tie.  The contest was ultimately decided by a coin toss, with Nelson unseating the incumbent as national and local media looked on.

Politics

Clyde Hill leans liberal in its politics, though less so than neighboring Bellevue. In the 2016 presidential election, of the 1,789 residents who voted, 56.18% voted for Hillary Clinton compared to 32.53% for Donald Trump.

Demographics

2010 census
At the 2010 census there were 2,984 people in 1,028 households, including 887 families, in the city. The racial makeup of the city was 84.3% White, 0.6% African American, 0.2% Native American, 12.1% Asian, 0.5% from other races, and 2.2% from two or more races. Hispanic or Latino of any race were 2.3%.

Of the 1,028 households 43.0% had children under the age of 18 living with them, 79.2% were married couples living together, 4.8% had a female householder with no husband present, 2.3% had a male householder with no wife present, and 13.7% were non-families. 12.2% of households were one person and 7.8% were one person aged 65 or older. The average household size was 2.90 and the average family size was 3.17.

The median age was 44.8 years. 29.4% of residents were under the age of 18; 4.2% were between the ages of 18 and 24; 16.8% were from 25 to 44; 31.4% were from 45 to 64; and 18.4% were 65 or older. The gender makeup of the city was 48.9% male and 51.1% female.

2000 census
At the 2000 census, there were 2,890 people in 1,054 households, including 893 families, in the city. The population density was 2,732.2 people per square mile (1,052.7/km). There were 1,076 housing units at an average density of 1,017.2 per square mile (391.9/km). The racial makeup of the city was 89.62% White, 0.55% African American, 0.17% Native American, 7.30% Asian, 0.59% from other races, and 1.76% from two or more races. Hispanic or Latino of any race were 1.49% of the population.

Of the 1,054 households 34.5% had children under the age of 18 living with them, 78.3% were married couples living together, 5.0% had a female householder with no husband present, and 15.2% were non-families. 12.8% of households were one person and 6.7% were one person aged 65 or older. The average household size was 2.74 and the average family size was 3.00.

The age distribution was 26.1% under the age of 18, 3.8% from 18 to 24, 20.3% from 25 to 44, 30.8% from 45 to 64, and 19.0% 65 or older. The median age was 45 years. For every 100 females there were 96.9 males. For every 100 females age 18 and over, there were 91.8 males.

The median household income was $132,468 and the median family income  was $150,237. Males had a median income of $100,000 versus $50,909 for females. The per capita income for the city was $78,252. About 0.8% of families and 0.8% of the population were below the poverty line, including 0.4% of those under age 18 and none of those age 65 or over.

Education
The city is in the Bellevue School District.

Most residents are zoned to Clyde Hill Elementary School while some are zoned to Medina Elementary School. All residents are zoned to Chinook Middle School and Bellevue High School.

Notable people
Satya Nadella, CEO of Microsoft
Félix Hernández, Seattle Mariners pitcher
John Olerud, retired former MLB first baseman
Sanjay G. Mavinkurve, programmed the first code of Facebook 
Alexey Pajitnov. Creator of Tetris

References

External links
 City of Clyde Hill Government

1953 establishments in Washington (state)
Cities in King County, Washington
Cities in Washington (state)